Cassandra Lily Patten (born 1 January 1987 at Cardinham, Cornwall, United Kingdom)<ref name=olympic></tt></ref> is a British freestyle swimmer and coach who won the bronze in the 10 km open-water event at the 2008 Beijing Olympics.

Early life
Cassie had always loved the water, Her Dad Tony and Sister Lucy would often go swimming in their spare time and she has been quoted staying it was 'this fun at an early age that inspired her to want to swim'. 
Cassie's first swimming lesson took place with Dave Darborne in Bodmin when she was five years old. He could see she loved swimming and had a natural talent. His natural ability of making learning fun, inspired her to join her local swimming team, Bodmin swimming club. Cassandra stayed there for the next 8 years where aged 13 she went to her first National age group championships where she came 5th in the 200m butterfly.

Aged 14 she then attended Plymouth College as a swimming scholar from the age of 11 to 18. She enjoyed her time at the school and she was made senior prefect and the house captain of Chaytor's House. Cassie was coached by Jon rudd, Amanda booth and Jo Johns in the highly successful Plymouth Leander Swimming  programme at this time.

Aged 19 Cassandra Moved to StockPort Metro Swimming club outside Manchester, to be coached by Sean Kelly. He moved her away from the 200m Butterfly and trained her to become a Distance Freestyle swimmer. Cassie would often swim 80–100 km per week at the Grand Central Pools in Stockport. Sean Kelly was her Coach at the Beijing Olympics.

Swimming career
Cassandra was a late developer in swimming. She won her first national medal in 2003 aged 16, which was a bronze in the 200m Butterfly. It was in 2003 that Cassandra first represented GB at the European Championships in Dublin.

The next year was her most successful in her Youth Career, at the 2004 Youth National championships she won 4 golds ( 100 & 200 butterfly, 400 & 800 freestyle) as well as 2 silver ( 200 Freestyle and 400 IM). She also qualified for the World short course Championships in Indianapolis, where she came 4th in the 800 Freestyle. 
  
At the British Championships in 2006 she won a bronze in the 400 m and a silver in the 800 m. At the British Championships in 2007 she won a bronze in the 400 m freestyle and a silver in the 200 m butterfly. In her third year at the championships which doubled as the 2008 Olympic trials she won silver in the 800 m freestyle, and qualified to represent Team GB in this event.

her open water career started in 2006 where she competed in several world and European Cup events. in her first year swimming Open water she won the overall best Female in Europe and took home the LEN cup.

She won a silver medal in the 10 km freestyle at the 2007 World championship at only three seconds behind Larisa Ilchenko, the gold medallist. Patten represented Great Britain at the 2008 Summer Olympics in the 800 m freestyle and also in the 10 km open water swimming event, where she won a bronze medal. Her international swimming career lasted 8 years and she competed in 1 Olympics, 8 World championship events and 10 European Championship events.

Post swimming career 
Since retiring from swimming,  'Cassie' has taken up coaching - which has seen her travel all over Europe delivering coaching sessions, with various companies including SwimQuest, Speedo, Zoggs, Swim Smooth and British swimming. Along side her coaching career, she has a growing career as a sports commentator. Cassie was the lead swimming pundit at the London Olympic Games for Sky Sports News in 2012 alongside commentating on the 10km Open water marathons in Hyde Park.

In 2022 Cassandra set up WaveCrest to coach the next generation of swimmers

"Swimming was my whole life for over 20 years. I poured every ounce of enthusiasm into it. I am so fortunate to have found these new outlets for that enthusiasm." - Cassie Patten

Personal Life 
Cassie is married with 2 children and currently lives in Oxfordshire

See also

 Wavecrest

 List of Olympic medalists in swimming (women)

References

External links
British Olympic Association athlete profile
British Swimming athlete profile

1987 births
British female swimmers
Olympic swimmers of Great Britain
Swimmers at the 2008 Summer Olympics
Living people
Female long-distance swimmers
Olympic bronze medallists for Great Britain
People educated at Plymouth College
Sportspeople from Cornwall
Olympic bronze medalists in swimming
Medalists at the 2008 Summer Olympics
World Aquatics Championships medalists in open water swimming